Caldicot was an ancient hundred of Monmouthshire, Wales. 

It was situated in the south-eastern part of the county, bounded on the north by the hundreds of Usk and Raglan; on the east by Gloucestershire; on the south by the Bristol Channel, and on the west by the hundred of Wentloog.

It contained the following ancient parishes:

Bishton
Caerwent
Caldicot
Chepstow
Christchurch
Dinham
Forest of Wentwood
Goldcliff
Howick
Ifton
Itton
Langstone
Llandevaud
Llandevenny
Llanmartin
Llanvaches
Llanvair Discoed
Llanvihangel Roggiet
Llanwern
Magor
Mathern
Mounton
Nash
Newchurch
Penhow
Penterry
Portskewett
Redwick
Rogiet
Runston
Shirenewton
St. Arvans
St. Brides Netherwent
St. Pierre
Sudbrook
Undy
Whitson
Wilcrick

The area is now administered by the local authorities of Newport and Monmouthshire.

External links
Caldicot Hundred on a Vision of Britain

References